"Cold as Ice" is a song by German recording artist Sarah Connor. A dance-pop song with slight contemporary R&B elements, it was written and produced by Kay Denar and Rob Tyger for Connor's seventh studio album, Real Love (2010). Released as the album's first single on 5 October 2010 in German-speaking Europe, the song peaked at number sixteen on the German Singles Chart and reached number twenty-seven in Austria, making it Connor's lowest-charting leading single to date. The song failed to chart in Switzerland.

Track listings

Notes
 denotes additional producer

Credits and personnel
Vocals: Sarah Connor
Writers: Rob Tyger, Kay Denar 
Publisher: George Glueck
All music: Tyger, Denar
Arrangement and recording: Tyger, Denar
Mixing: Tyger, Denar 
Mastering: Tyger, Denar

Charts

References

2010 singles
Sarah Connor (singer) songs
Songs written by Kay Denar
Songs written by Rob Tyger
2010 songs
X-Cell Records singles